The 2019 TCR Japan Touring Car Series season was the first season of the TCR Japan Touring Car Series. The series supported the 2019 Super Formula Championship.

Teams and drivers 
Yokohama is set to be the official tyre supplier.

Race calendar and results 
The calendar was announced on 27 October 2018 with 5 confirmed dates with all rounds held in Japan and supporting the Super Formula Championship.

Championship standings

Scoring systems

TCR Japan Series 

† – Drivers did not finish the race, but were classified as they completed over 75% of the race distance.

Gentleman championship

Entrants championship

Footnotes

References

External links 
 

TCR Japan Touring Car Series
Japan Touring Car Series